Evin Demirhan Yavuz (born 2 July 1995) is a Turkish freestyle wrestler competing in the 50 kg division. She is a member of Ankara EGO.

Early life
Demirhan was born into a crowded family in poverty in Siirt, southeastern Turkey on 2 July 1995.  During her secondary education at Şehit Zafer Kılıç Sports High School in her hometown, she benefited from a scholarship of the Turkish Wrestling Foundation as one of the twenty successful students and talented wrestlers. She supported her family of 13 financially by wrestling.

In the 89-minute documentary movie titled Siirt'in Sırrı, English : "Know My Name", Demirhan plays the leading role as a 16-year-old girl which features her life and struggle to financially support her family and to build a future for herself. The movie was awarded the "Best National Documentary Film Prize" at the 49th International Antalya Film Festival ("Golden Orange Award") and the "Special Jury Prize for Documentary Film" at the 19th International Adana Film Festival ("Golden Boll Award") both in 2012.

Sports career
Demirhan began sport wrestling as she was 15 years of age. She trains twelve hours a day, six day a week. She was four times Turkish champion in her weight class.

She won the silver medal in the 44 kg event at the 2012 European Junior Wrestling Championships held in Zagreb, Croatia, a bronze medal in the 44 kg event at the 2013 European Junior Wrestling Championships in Skopje, Macedonia, a bronze medal in the 44 kg event at the 2013 World Junior Wrestling Championships in Sofia, Bulgaria, the silver medal at the 2013 European Junior Wrestling Championships, the silver medal at the 2014 European Junior Wrestling Championships, and a bronze medal in the 48 kg event at the same championships of 2015 in Istanbul, Turkey.

She took part at the 2015 European Games in Baku, Azerbaijan competing in the 48 kg event without gaining a medal. In 2017, Demirhan captured the silver medal at the Islamic Solidarity Games in Azerbaijan. She was also the bronze medalist in the 48 kg event at the 2017 World Wrestling Championships held in Paris, France. In 2019, she captured bronze medals at the European Games and at the European Wrestling Championships. In January 2021, she won the silver medal in the women's 50 kg event at the Grand Prix de France Henri Deglane 2021 held in Nice, France. In March 2021, she qualified at the European Qualification Tournament to compete at the 2020 Summer Olympics in Tokyo, Japan. She competed in the women's 50 kg event at the 2020 Summer Olympics. In October 2021, she was eliminated in her first match in the women's 50 kg event at the 2021 World Wrestling Championships held in Oslo, Norway.

In 2022, she competed in the 50 kg event at the Yasar Dogu Tournament held in Istanbul, Turkey. In March 2022, she won the gold medal in the 50 kg event at the 2022 European Wrestling Championships held in Budapest, Hungary. A few months later, she won the gold medal in the 50 kg event at the 2022 Mediterranean Games held in Oran, Algeria.

References

External links 
 

1995 births
Living people
People from Siirt
Turkish female sport wrestlers
Olympic wrestlers of Turkey
Wrestlers at the 2020 Summer Olympics
World Wrestling Championships medalists
European Wrestling Championships medalists
European Games medalists in wrestling
European Games bronze medalists for Turkey
Wrestlers at the 2015 European Games
Wrestlers at the 2019 European Games
Mediterranean Games medalists in wrestling
Mediterranean Games gold medalists for Turkey
Competitors at the 2018 Mediterranean Games
Competitors at the 2022 Mediterranean Games
Islamic Solidarity Games medalists in wrestling
Islamic Solidarity Games competitors for Turkey
20th-century Turkish sportswomen
21st-century Turkish sportswomen